Tyoplo-Ogaryovsky District  is an administrative district (raion), one of the twenty-three in Tula Oblast, Russia. As a municipal division, it is incorporated as Tyoplo-Ogaryovsky Municipal District. It is located in the south of the oblast. Its administrative center is the urban locality (a work settlement) of Tyoploye. Population: 12,705 (2010 Census);  The population of Tyoploye accounts for 40.3% of the district's total population.

References

Notes

Sources

Districts of Tula Oblast